Nebria shirahatai is a species of ground beetle in the Nebriinae subfamily that is endemic to Japan.

References

shirahatai
Beetles described in 1947
Beetles of Asia
Endemic fauna of Japan